Miras International School, Almaty is an international school providing both International Baccalaureate and Kazakh Curriculum in the foothills of Almaty, Kazakhstan.

See also

List of schools in Almaty

External links
School Website
MISMUN website
Nursultan Nazerbayev Educational Foundation website
New England Association of Schools and Colleges NEASC website
Council of International Schools CIS website
International Baccalaureate Organization website

References

Schools in Kazakhstan
International schools in Kazakhstan
Education in Almaty
Educational institutions established in 1999
1999 establishments in Kazakhstan